The 2014 Texas A&M–Commerce Lions football team represented Texas A&M University–Commerce in the 2014 NCAA Division II football season. They were led by head coach Colby Carthel, who was in his second season at Texas A&M–Commerce. The Lions played their home games at Memorial Stadium and were members of the Lone Star Conference (LSC).  With a 9–3 record, the Lions were outright Lone Star champions for the first time since 1990. They were selected to participate in the C.H.A.M.P.S. Heart of Texas Bowl, where they defeated  in their first postseason win since the 1991 NCAA Division II playoffs.

Schedule

Postseason awards

All-Americans
Ricky Collins, First Team Receiver 
Vernon Johnson, First Team Receiver 
Saul Martinez, Second Team Placekicer 
Toni Pulu, Third Team Defensive Line

All-Lone Star Conference

LSC Superlatives
Defensive Player of the Year: Toni Pulu 
Receiver of The Year: Vernon Johnson

LSC First Team
Ricky Collins, Wide Receiver 
Ron Fields, Cornerback 
Vernon Johnson, Wide Receiver  
Saul Martinez, Kicker 
Toni Pulu, Defensive End
Charlie Tuaau, Defensive Tackle

LSC Second Team
Steven Baker, Safety  
Joe Bergeron, Running Back
Elwood Clement, Offensive Tackle
Izzy Eziakor, Safety
Tyrik Rollison, Quarterback 
Davarus Shores, Linebacker 
Seth Smith, Wide Receiver 
Charles Woods, Linebacker

LSC Honorable Mention
Tyree Barton, Linebacker 
Michael Boyefio, Center
Jordan DeCorte, Offensive Guard
Ashton Dorsey, Defensive End
Rumzee Fakhouri, Offensive Tackle 
Shawn Hooks, Return Specialist 
Traven Johnson, Cornerback
Taylor Peasha, Tight End 
Cole Pitts, Linebacker 
Cameron Rogers, Deep Snapper
Shane Thompson, Offensive Guard
Chase Thrasher, Punter

References

Texas AandM-Commerce
Texas A&M–Commerce Lions football seasons
Lone Star Conference football champion seasons
Texas AandM-Commerce Lions Football